Allium plurifoliatum is a Chinese species of wild onion. It has been reported from Anhui, Gansu, Hubei, Shaanxi, and Sichuan at elevations of 1600–3300 m.

Allium plurifoliatum has a cluster of narrow bulbs each up to 10 mm across. Scape is up to 40 cm long. Leaves are flat, thin, about the same length as the scape. Umbel has only a few red or purple flowers.

Varieties
Allium plurifoliatum var. plurifoliatum --- inner filaments broadened at base, each with a pair of teeth
Allium plurifoliatum var. zhegushanense J. M. Xu --- filaments gradually tapering, without teeth (known only from Sichuan)

formerly included
Allium plurifoliatum var. stenodon (Nakai & Kitag.) J.M.Xu, now called Allium thunbergii var. thunbergii

References

plurifoliatum
Onions
Flora of China
Plants described in 1906